Erich Jagsch (born 31 August 1955) is a former Austrian racing cyclist. He rode in the 1980 Tour de France.

References

External links

1955 births
Living people
Austrian male cyclists
People from Klosterneuburg
Sportspeople from Lower Austria
20th-century Austrian people